Muhammad Azrin Afiq bin Rusmini (born 2 January 2000) is a Malaysian professional footballer who plays as a defender for Malaysia Super League club Kedah Darul Aman, on loan from Selangor.

Club career

Selangor
On early career, Azrin signed for Selangor from Academy Mokhtar Dahari at the age of 19. He made his debut for the first team on August 29, 2020, against Petaling Jaya City, coming on as substitute. On 25 November 2021, Selangor confirmed that Azrin would be definitely promoted to Selangor's first team for 2022 season.

Kedah Darul Aman (loan)
On 29 December 2022, Azrin signed to Kedah Darul Aman on loan until the end of the 2023 season.

International career

Youth
Azrin represented the Malaysian at various youth levels and was selected by under-19 squad under coach Brad Maloney as part of the Malaysia's 24-man squad set for 2020 AFC U-19 Championship qualification tournament. He was part of the under-23 squad for represent 2021 Southeast Asian Games in Vietnam.

Career statistics

Club

References

External links
 

Living people
Malaysian footballers
Selangor FA players
Kedah Darul Aman F.C. players
Malaysia Premier League players
Malaysia Super League players
Malaysian people of Malay descent
People from Selangor
Association football defenders
2000 births
Competitors at the 2021 Southeast Asian Games
Southeast Asian Games competitors for Malaysia